The Academy of Fine Arts, in Kolkata (formerly Calcutta) is one of the oldest fine arts societies in India.

History 
The academy was formally established in 1933 by Lady Ranu Mukherjee. It was initially located in a room loaned by the Indian Museum, and the annual exhibitions used to take place in the adjoining verandah.

In the 1950s, thanks to the efforts of Lady Ranu Mookerjee and patronage by Bidhan Chandra Roy, Chief Minister of West Bengal, as well as Jawaharlal Nehru, the Prime Minister of India, the academy was shifted to a much larger space in the Cathedral Road, beside St. Paul's Cathedral, the present location. At present, Prasun Mukherjee is the chairman of board of trustees and Kallol Bose is the Jt. secretary of executive committee.

There are some famous paintings here like Saat Bhai Champa by Gaganendranath Tagore, Shiva with Ganesh by Jamini Roy.

Theatre auditorium 

There is a theatre auditorium in Academy of Fine Arts which is one of the most popular spots for performers and viewers of the city. Since 1984, an annual theatre festival is organised here.

References

External links 
 

Culture of Kolkata
Art museums and galleries in Kolkata
Arts organisations based in India
1933 establishments in India
1933 in art
Education in Kolkata
Museums in Kolkata
Theatres in Kolkata